Az-Zawiya is a Palestinian town in the Salfit Governorate in the northern West Bank, located  west of Salfit and south of Qalqilya. According to the Palestinian Central Bureau of Statistics, az-Zawiya had a population of 4,754 in 2007. The town's population is made up of primarily three families: Shuqeir (45%), Muqadi (30%) and Raddad (20%), while the remaining 5% consists of Palestinian refugee families such as Shamlawi, Rabi and Yusif.

Location
It is bordered by Biddya  to the east, Rafat to the south, Kafr Qasem  to the west, and Azzun Atma  and Mas-ha  to the north.

History
Sherds from IA II, Roman and  Byzantine eras have been found.

Ottoman era
Zawiya appeared in the 1596 Ottoman tax registers as being in the Nahiya of Jabal Qubal, part of the Sanjak of Nablus. It had a population of 4 households, all Muslim. The villagers paid a fixed tax-rate of 33.3% on agricultural products, including wheat, barley, fruit trees, goats and beehives,  in addition to occasional revenues; a total of 800 akçe,

In 1838, Edward Robinson noted it as a village, es-Zawieh, in the Jurat Merda district, south of Nablus.

Victor Guérin visited the village in 1870, and described it as having about 200 inhabitants and a small mosque. In 1882, the PEF's Survey of Western Palestine (SWP) described the village as being of moderate size, "probably an ancient place, having rock-cut tombs to the south."

British Mandate era
In the 1922 census of Palestine, conducted by the British Mandate authorities, Zawiya (called: Zawiyeh)  had a population of 398, 396 Muslims and 2 Christians, both Orthodox,  while in the 1931 census it had 122 occupied houses and a population of 513, all Muslim.

In the 1945 statistics the population was 720, all Muslims, while the total land area was 11,516 dunams, according to an official land and population survey. Of this, 964 were allocated for plantations and irrigable land, 2,055 for cereals, while 41 dunams were classified as built-up (urban) areas.

Jordanian era
In the wake of the 1948 Arab–Israeli War, and after the 1949 Armistice Agreements, Az-Zawiya came under Jordanian rule.

The Jordanian census of 1961 found 1,170 inhabitants.

Post-1967
Since the Six-Day War in 1967, Az-Zawiya has been under Israeli occupation.

After the 1995 accords, 9.5% of village land was classified as Area B, the remaining 90.5% as Area C.

Israel confiscated 662 dunams of Zawiya land in order to establish an Israeli quarry to the west of the town. The quarry, (also called the Nahal Raba quarry, and Mazor Atiqa), is now isolated from az-Zawiya and Rafat behind the West Bank barrier in the Seam Zone. A local subsidiary of HeidelbergCement now operates the quarry.

In 2004, one Israeli, one Palestinian were arrested and 40 were wounded in anti-wall protest at Az-Zawiya.

The Israeli outpost Magen Dan was established after settlers forcefully seized 76 dunums of village land from Zawiya.

Agriculture is the town's main economic sector with olives, figs, almonds, lentils and wheat being the primary crops. There are over 2,700 dunams of land making up az-Zawiya's jurisdiction, of which 900 is built-up area. Sheep is the main livestock grazed in az-Zawiya. There are also small industries such as sewing, carpentry and metal-working. There are over 120 shops in the town. The Second Intifada has drastically decreased revenue from agricultural exports to Israel and Jordan, slashing prices in half.

Az-Zawiya is governed by a municipal council whose members are elected every four years. The town has been a municipality since 1996. Mayor Taleb Raddad (Abu al-Adeeb) has been elected mayor in each local election, serving for three terms. Az-Zawiya has two medical clinics, two boys' schools and two girls' schools. The town will be enclosed on four sides with the completion of the separation barrier forming the az-Zawiya enclave.

In 2001 Israeli settlers raided the area destroying 25 dunams of olive groves contiguous to Highway 5.

Archaeology
Az-Zawiya contains an ancient ruin called Deir Qassis, where sherds from  IA I, IA II,  Persian,  Byzantine,  Umayyad/Abbasid, Crusader/Ayyubid and  Mamluk eras have been found.
Deir Qassis was examined in 1870:First I examined a great birket 28 paces long and 25 broad; it is partly cut in the rock, and partly constructed of great blocks with a boss and covered with thick cement.	Before this basin lies a platform covered with little cubes of white mosaic, which shows that it was formerly paved. The group of houses which once stood in this place form a mass of rubbish of all kinds heaped upon the ground. A little mosque is alone standing: its lintel is apparently ancient, but the decorations are Arabic. Above the lintel is a pointed arch, whose principal feature is a broad voussoir furrowed by little canals perpendicular to the curve, like pipes, arranged to resemble a series of very narrow key-stones separated by deep joints.	This disposition is met with in a large number of ancient mosques round and above the doors. It is also found in several churches of Palestine, especially that of the Holy Sepulchre and that of Saint Anne, the Christians having borrowed this method of decoration from the Arabs [..] 'At some distance from the mosque there are ancient quarries and several tombs, rock-cut.

In the late 19th century, the following archeological remains were noted: "On a hill west of the village there are some rude tombs; one is an arcosolium, with a loculus sunk beneath. The height of the arch is 4 feet 6 inches, the diameter 8 feet, the tomb within 5 feet 6 inches long, and the arch 5 feet to the back."

Later examination has revealed that the main remains are from the late Roman and Byzantine eras.

References

Bibliography

External links
Welcome To al-Zawiya
Zawiya, Welcome to Palestine
Survey of Western Palestine, Map 14:    IAA, Wikimedia commons 
Az Zawiya Town (Fact Sheet),   Applied Research Institute–Jerusalem (ARIJ)
Az Zawiya Town Profile, ARIJ
Az Zawiya  aerial photo, ARIJ
Development Priorities and Needs in Az Zawiya, ARIJ
 Az Zawiya: A model for non-violent resistance against the construction of the Segregation Wall, August 5, 2004,  POICA
 Construction works in The Segregation Wall resumed The case of As Sawiya village Salfit governorate, May 21, 2005, POICA
Az Zawiya village lands under unlawful confiscation attack by the Israeli Occupation, November 29, 2005,  POICA
 More of Az Zawiya village lands confiscated for the construction of a security road October 9, 2006, POICA

Salfit Governorate
Towns in Salfit Governorate
Municipalities of West Bank
Municipalities of the State of Palestine